The Adventure Wheely II is a French powered parachute that was designed and produced by Adventure SA of Paris. Now out of production, when it was available the aircraft was supplied as a complete ready-to-fly-aircraft.

Design and development
It features a  parachute-style wing, two-seats-in-tandem, tricycle landing gear and dual  Solo 210 engines mounted together in pusher configuration driving a single propeller, although other engines can be used.

The aircraft carriage is built from a combination of bolted aluminium and plastics. The propeller is mounted within a two-tube safety ring, with a mesh net set forward to keep objects out of the propeller. In flight steering is accomplished via handles that actuate the canopy brakes, creating roll and yaw. The main landing gear incorporates spring rod suspension.

Specifications (Wheely II)

References

Wheely II
2000s French sport aircraft
2000s French ultralight aircraft
Twin-engined single-prop pusher aircraft
Powered parachutes